Night photography (also called nighttime photography) refers to the activity of capturing images outdoors at night, between dusk and dawn. Night photographers generally have a choice between using artificial lighting and using a long exposure, exposing the shot for seconds, minutes, or even hours in order to give photosensitive film or an image sensor enough time to capture a desirable image. With the progress of high-speed films, higher-sensitivity digital sensors, wide-aperture lenses, and the ever-greater power of urban lights, night photography is increasingly possible using available light.

History
The very long exposure times of early photographic processes didn't mean people didn't try to take photographs at night from quite early on. The development of mechanical clock drives meant cameras attached to telescopes could eventually capture successful images of celestial objects. 

The first-known attempt at astronomical photography was by Louis Jacques Mandé Daguerre, inventor of the daguerreotype process which bears his name, who attempted in 1839 to photograph the Moon. Tracking errors in guiding the telescope during the long exposure meant the photograph came out as an indistinct fuzzy spot. 

John William Draper, New York University Professor of Chemistry, physician and scientific experimenter managed to make the first successful photograph of the moon a year later on March 23, 1840, taking a 20-minute-long daguerreotype image using a 5-inch (13 cm) reflecting telescope.

The increasing use of street lighting throughout the second half of the 19th century meant it was possible to capture nighttime scenes despite the long exposure times of the equipment of the period. 

Developments in illumination, especially through the use of electricity, coincided with the shortening of exposure times. By the beginning of the 20th century newspapers and journals often showed night time views usually of illuminated urban streets or places of amusement such as Coney Island.  

In the early 1900s, a few notable photographers, Alfred Stieglitz and William Fraser, began working at night. The first known female night photographer is Jessie Tarbox Beals. The first photographers known to have produced large bodies of work at night were Brassai and Bill Brandt.  In 1932, Brassai published Paris de Nuit, a book of black-and-white photographs of the streets of Paris at night.  During World War II, British photographer Brandt took advantage of the black-out conditions to photograph the streets of London by moonlight.

Photography at night found several new practitioners in the 1970s,  beginning with the black and white photographs that Richard Misrach made of desert flora (1975–77). Joel Meyerowitz made luminous large format color studies of Cape Cod at nightfall which were published in his influential book, Cape Light (1979). Jan Staller’s twilight color photographs (1977–84) of abandoned and derelict parts of New York City captured uncanny visions of the urban landscape lit by the glare of sodium vapor street lights.

By the 1990s, British-born photographer Michael Kenna had established himself as the most commercially successful night photographer. His black-and-white landscapes were most often set between dusk and dawn in locations that included San Francisco, Japan, France, and England. Some of his most memorable projects depict the Ford Motor Company's Rouge River plant, the Ratcliffe-on-Soar Power Station in the East Midlands in England, and many of the Nazi concentration camps scattered across Germany, France, Belgium, Poland and Austria.

During the beginning of the 21st century, the popularity of digital cameras made it much easier for beginning photographers to understand the complexities of photographing at night. Today, there are hundreds of websites dedicated to night photography.

Subjects
Common subjects photographed at night or in low light include the following:
Celestial bodies – the Moon, stars, planets, etc. (see astrophotography and star trail)
City skylines
Factories and industrial areas, particularly those that are brightly lit and are emitting smoke, steam, or another aerosol
Fireworks
Nightlife or rock concerts
Lit caves
Roads with or without cars
Abandoned buildings or other artificial structures that are only moonlit
Bodies of water that are reflecting moonlight or city lights – lakes, rivers, canals, etc.
Lightning during thunderstorms
Aurora (northern or southern lights)
Lava
Amusement rides
Lit aircraft
Bioluminescence

Technique and equipment

The following techniques and equipment are generally used in night photography.

 A tripod is usually necessary due to the long exposure times. Alternatively, the camera may be placed on a steady, flat object e.g. a table or chair, low wall, window sill, etc.
 A shutter release cable or self timer is almost always used to prevent camera shake when the shutter is released.
 Manual focus, since autofocus systems usually operate poorly in low light conditions.   Newer digital cameras incorporate a Live View mode which often allows very accurate manual focusing.
 A stopwatch or remote timer, to time very long exposures where the camera's bulb setting is used.
 A camera lens with a wide aperture, preferably one with aspherical elements that can minimize coma
A smartphone with a night photography mode, such as Night Mode on Huawei phones, Night Sight on Google Pixel phones, Night Mode on Samsung Galaxy phones, Night Mode on iPhone 11 Pro and Nightscape on Oneplus phones

Long exposures and multiple flashes
The long-exposure multiple-flash technique is a method of night or low-light photography which use a mobile flash unit to expose various parts of a building or interior using a long exposure.

This technique is often combined with using coloured gels in front of the flash unit to provide different colours in order to illuminate the subject in different ways. It is also common to flash the unit several times during the exposure while swapping the colours of the gels around to mix colours on the final photo. This requires some skill and a lot of imagination since it is not possible to see how the effects will turn out until the exposure is complete. By using this technique, the photographer can illuminate specific parts of the subject in different colours creating shadows in ways which would not normally be possible.

Painting with light

When the correct equipment is used such as a tripod and shutter release cable, the photographer can use long exposures to photograph images of light.  For example, when photographing a subject try switching the exposure to manual and selecting the bulb setting on the camera.  Once this is achieved trip the shutter and photograph your subject moving a flashlight or any small light in various patterns.  Experiment with this outcome to produce artistic results.  Multiple attempts are usually needed to produce a desired result.

High ISO

Advanced imaging sensors along with sophisticated software processing makes low-light photography with High ISO possible without tripod or long exposure. Digital SLRs have high end APS-C and full-frame digital SLR sensors which have a very large dynamic range and high sensitivity, making them capable of night photography. These large sensor cameras are able to collect more light than smaller sensors due to the size of the imaging area. Combined with large aperture lenses and other equipment and techniques, this allows for photography with high quality in very dark locations.

BSI-CMOS is another type of CMOS sensor that is gradually entering the compact camera segment which is superior to the traditional CCD sensors. Cameras with small sensors such as: Sony Cyber-shot DSC-RX100, Nikon 1 J2 and Canon PowerShot G1X give good images up to ISO 400.

Moonlight photography
Moonlight photography (capturing scenes on Earth illuminated by moonlight) greatly differs from lunar photography (capturing scenes on the Moon illuminated by direct sunlight). The Moon has an effective albedo of approximately 0.12, comparable to worn asphalt concrete. Since the Moon is essentially a dark body in direct sunlight, photographing its surface needs an exposure comparable to what a photographer would use for ordinary, mid-brightness surfaces (buildings, trees, faces, etc.) with an overcast sky.

The sunlight reflected from the full Moon onto Earth is about 1/250,000 of the brightness of direct sunlight in daytime. Since , full-moon photography requires 18 stops more exposure than sunlight photography, for which the sunny 16 rule is a commonly used guideline.

Reciprocity failure
Imagine a directly sunlit exposure of 1/100 second at ISO 100 and f/16 (the baseline of sunny 16). Adding 18 stops to convert from the Sun to the Moon could result in a shutter speed of 8 seconds at ISO 400 and f/2 (+10 stops of time, +2 stops of ISO, +6 stops of aperture). However, on most chemical film, such an exposure would turn out too dark. This is because film does not expose in linear proportion to the light it absorbs, an effect called reciprocity failure. At light levels as dim as moonlight, it needs more light than a linear extrapolation of daylight values would suggest.

For example, testing shows that Kodak Portra needs 1 extra stop for a nominal 8-second exposure, so in this case it would need 16 seconds.

In practice, moonlight photography often uses exposures of several minutes. Digital cameras generally have less reciprocity failure, but do show image noise in low light.

Examples

Published night photographers
This section includes significant night photographers who have published books dedicated to night photography, and some of their selected works.
 Brassai
 Paris de Nuit, Arts et metiers graphiques, 1932.
 Harold Burdekin and John Morrison
 London Night, Collins, 1934.
 Jeff Brouws
 Inside the Live Reptile Tent, Chronicle Books, 2001. 
 Alan Delaney
 London After Dark, Phaidon Press, 1993. 
 Neil Folberg
 Celestial Nights, Aperture Foundation, 2001. 
 Karekin Goekjian
 Light After Dark, Lucinne, Inc. ASIN B0006QOVCG
 Todd Hido
 Outskirts, Nazraeli Press, 2002. 
 Peter Hujar
 Night, Matthew Marks Gallery/Fraenkel Gallery, 2005. 
 Rolfe Horn
 28 Photographs, Nazraeli Press. 
 Lance Keimig
Night Photography, Finding Your Way In The Dark, Focal Press, 2010. 
 Brian Kelly
 Grand Rapids:  Night After Night, Glass Eye, 2001. 
 Michael Kenna
 The Rouge, RAM Publications, 1995. 
 Night Work, Nazraeli Press, 2000. 
 William Lesch
 Expansions, RAM Publications, 1992. 
 O. Winston Link
 The Last Steam Railroad in America, Harry Abrams, 1995. 
 Tom Paiva
 Industrial Night, The Image Room, 2002. 
 Troy Paiva
 Night Vision: The Art of Urban Exploration, Chronicle Books, 2008. 
 Lost America: The Abandoned Roadside West, MBI Publishing, 2003. 
 Andrew Sanderson
 Night Photography, Amphoto Books. 
 Bill Schwab
 Bill Schwab:  Photographs, North Light Press, 1999. 
 Gathering Calm, North Light Press, 2005. 
 Jan Staller
 Frontier New York, Hudson Hills Press, 1988. 
 Zabrina Tipton
 At Night in San Francisco, San Francisco Guild of the Arts Press, 2006. 
 Giovanna Tucker
 "How to Night Photography", 2011. 
 Nora Vrublevska and Dan Squires
 "Cambridge at Night", 2013. 
 Volkmar Wentzel
 Washington by Night, Fulcrum Publishing, 1998.

See also
 Available light
 Light painting

References

External links

Comprehensive tutorials and articles about how to do night photography by The Nocturnes

 

Photography by genre
Night in culture
Photographic techniques